Bin Weevils was a British MMORPG (Massively Multiplayer Online Role-Playing Game) involving a virtual world containing a range of online games and activities.

The game was developed by 55 Pixels Limited (previously Bin Weevils Limited) and launched in January 2004 as a joint venture between Nickelodeon UK, Prism Entertainment Ltd and CEG (Creative Entertainment Group).  Brief animated clips based on characters from the game aired on TV in 2006. In 2007, Bin Weevils was re-launched as an independent website with a redesign and new content, making way for books, magazines, and products inspired by the game world.

Bin Weevils was previously ranked as one of the most visited virtual world websites in the United Kingdom, reaching over 20 million users in 2013. Bin Weevils reached 1.2 million website monthly visitors in September 2012.

55 Pixels filed for liquidation in December 2020. The website was quietly taken offline on 16 January 2021, after Adobe Flash was discontinued.

Gameplay 
Bin Weevils was based on the theme of real creatures, weevils. Players could create, customize and control their own character in an online world. The game was set in a bin-like setting where many locations were specifically designed for this theme (e.g. Kip's Scrapyard, Peel's Park, Ink's Orange Peel) with items you would find usually in a bin, such as mould and orange peels. Players had their own "nest" in which they were able to adjust the colour and design the rooms with items. Players could choose to upgrade the nest to all 8 rooms using the Mulch currency via a membership and were also able to decorate their rooms by buying items from the "Shopping Mall" and placing the items in their rooms accordingly.  Nestco was the main shopping department, where players could purchase nest items and bundles to decorate their nest rooms with. Nestco included over 18 item categories, the Nestige Range, and a showroom. The items could be sold at one of the locations in the game if the player didn't want the item anymore for Mulch currency. The nest consisted of a private cinema, a plaza (both required membership), a garden, nest generator, and a Bin Bot Portal. All players also had a "Bin Card" in their nest, which they stamped every day to collect rewards, including hat coupons, item vouchers, plants, XP, Dosh, Mulch, and much more.

Plazas were located underneath a user's nest, and contained five virtual businesses. These included a photo studio where members could decorate a studio with props, cutouts, decorations, and backdrops for other users to take pictures in. Users could frame their pictures in different frames and sizes and place them in their nest rooms. A Bin Tycoon would earn earnings at the ATM Cash Machines for every photo frame purchased. Plazas also featured four party rooms, where members could decorate party rooms with a wide variety of decorations and party items for players to party in. They could customise each party room with text, text colours, facades, decorations, and music. For every customer members received from the plaza directory, members would earn earnings at the ATM Cash Machines.

Other virtual businesses included magazines and race tracks. Members could publish weekly magazines using text, fonts, page layouts, stickers, and photos from their own Bin Tycoon Camera. They could name their magazines and could become journalists, write on the latest game news, and take pictures from their camera around the game in different sizes for their magazine issues. Players could rate magazines and in return members would earn earnings at ATM Cash Machines for every rate they received and for publishing a weekly issue. The Weevil Wheels Track Builder at the Dirt Valley allowed members to design and run race track businesses using track builder kits. Members could design their own race track with 3D features for other players to play on at the Weevil Wheels Track Builder directory. In return for every play and rating they received on their race tracks, members would earn earnings at ATM Cash Machines. They would also earn earnings for having their race track approved.

The main navigation of the game was the Map which players could use to travel to different areas of the game world. The game world consisted of 15 main areas for users to explore: Flum's Fountain, Lab's Lab, Dosh's Palace, Castle Gam, Rigg's Movie Multiplex, Sink's Sub, Rum's Airport, Tink's Tree, Gong's Pipenest, Club Fling, Dirt Valley, Figg's Cafe, Shopping Mall, Bin Pets Paradise, and Flem Manor. Some locations were only accessible by becoming an SWS Member (Secret Agent). The Summer Fair was a temporary pop-up location during the summer months where players could play fairground minigames to earn 'Tokens' and buy prizes for their nest from the Prize Huts. Summer Fair attractions included the Gunge Tent, Ram's Arcade, Fab's Fortune Teller, Duck Soaker, Bin The Ball, Spin The Wheel, Funhouse, Weekly Challenge, Gong's Hammer, Bin Pet Bounce, and Gam's Cannon.

Inside most of the main areas contained additional smaller areas, such as shops and areas containing games (1 player, 2 player, and 4 player games), missions, quests and activities. There were several shops where players could purchase items with any of Bin Weevils' 2 currencies; ("Mulch") and ("Dosh"). Mulch was earned by playing games, harvesting plants and other activities while Dosh remained a premium currency which was earned by becoming a Bin Tycoon, buying Dosh top-up bundles and watching advertisements. There were several multiplayer games which players had the choice to participate in to earn currency ("Mulch") and experience points ("XP").  There were also a number of educational games, such as the "Daily Brain Strain," which players could visit every day to test their knowledge through a series of math, geography and puzzle questions. Players who participated in the 60 seconds received Mulch and XP based on how well they have performed. Players could challenge themselves on leaderboards. Players could also enter codes to receive rewards.

All users had a garden outside of their nest, in which they could choose to buy plants from the Garden Shop and plant and the harvest for in-game currency ("Mulch") and experience points ("XP"). The user could save the currency or buy more plants and the XP contributes to levelling up towards the next level. The gardens could be expanded to deluxe and super deluxe sizes. There were 80 levels in total but more were often added. In addition, paying players could choose to purchase a virtual pet called a "Bin Pet."  The Bin Pet had its own profile and items. Players could choose to feed their Bin Pet and make the pet character perform tricks and play mini-games. Bin Pets could be looked after by feeding them and training them to do tricks, including juggling, fetching, spinning, waving and jumping. Players could teach their Bin Pet to climb on their avatar and explore the game world with them or on their back. Interacting with other Bin Pets improved a Bin Pet's fitness and endurance mechanics. Bin Pets could learn skills and copy other Bin Pets. Players could teach their Bin Pet to copy their weevil actions, (waving, jumping, standing, etc).

A well-levelled Bin Pet was able perform their skills and tricks at a fast rate. Each Bin Pet trick and skill came with its own unique level, progress, stars and juggling training paths. There were over 30 Bin Pet commands and several training paths  with hundreds of juggling levels players could unlock, including pro and elite levels. The Bin Pet profile was the location where players could keep an observation on their pet's food, vitality, fitness and endurance mechanics. Non-paying players could also choose and also own a virtual pet for 24 hours. This feature was called "Pet-For-A-Day" and was first revealed in 2014.

Membership 

Bin Tycoon was a membership which unlocked gameplay elements such as in game items and activities. Many who subscribed to a premium membership received a monthly Dosh wage that gradually increased, depending on how many months a player had a premium membership. With this salary, the player could purchase hats for their character, items and clothing for their virtual pet, write magazines, access exclusive item bundles, and much more to do.

The currency "Dosh" was introduced in 2012 and replaced high Mulch prices in many areas, although it requires real currency payment. However, from time to time, players could take part in challenges, watch advertisements, or enter codes to earn the currency. It was possible to become a paying member for 1 month with an SMS text in the early stages of the game, but was discontinued in 2013. Players were still eligible to buy Mulch from the subscription section before 2013, the highest amount being £14.99 for 75,000 Mulch. Players could still acquire the currency in the game, although it was the main currency for a lot of activities. Players could choose to play multiplayer games to win currency or submit codes, etc. Dosh was the only currency to buy on the membership page. Bin Weevils revealed in 2015 that 90% of the content on the site was free to play and 90% of their audience was non-paying members.

Safety and communication 
Bin Weevils represented the kidSAFE seal on their website, as well as this they claim that players chat and buddy messages were moderated 24/7 so that there was no exchange of personal information or inappropriate language. The moderation system was based on a ticket method, according to the Bin Weevils support page. When a player used an offensive term, live moderators were notified and a punishment was imposed on a player's account that ranged from one day to a permanent suspension. As well as this, the game also had a reporting interface where players submitted reports on another player manually through the player's profile. The report functionality contained reasons that the player decided to report, or a field where the player chose to explain what the other player has done.

Other

Merchandise 
Bin Weevils signed a licensing agreement to launch a game-based merchandise range with the toy manufacturer Character Options. The merchandise consisted of a trading card game that was launched in 2012, a clothing set, backpacks, figurines, books and toys which launched in October 2012 and books. Bin Weevils partnered with Sony in December 2012. A competition was held relating to the album which four children could be picked to write a song for the album. The album was launched on 29 July 2013 with a tracklist of 12 children's songs. In November 2013, Bin Weevils partnered with WellChild to help raise money for sick children in the United Kingdom. Users could buy a Bin Weevils T-shirt and choose the design they wanted on their clothes, and 20 percent of every sale would go to WellChild. A Bin Weevils Magazine launched in January 2012 featuring characters, fact files, puzzles, guides, stories, comics and mysteries inspired by the online world.

Bin Bots 
Bin Weevils launched collectable creatures known as Bin Bots in October 2012. Each Bin Bot had its own unique name, personality, backstory and character. Bin Bot collectable figures launched in UK supermarkets with codes to unlock virtual goods online. By reaching high levels on the mobile app Tink's Blocks exclusive Bin Bots were earned. Bin Bots were housed in a player's Bin Bot Portal.

Certain Bin Bots could be placed in a microscopic world with zoom in features. Players could obtain a mystery Bin Bot online at the Claw Machine and mix potion bottle combinations together at the Bin Bot Maker to obtain the Bin Bot creatures. Both machines were invented by the scientist Lab and were located online outside his laboratory. Members could swap microscopic Bin Bots with other players in the Bin Bot Portal to complete their collections.

Apps

Tink's Blocks 
A mobile app version of Tink's Blocks was released in December 2012, inspired by the popular online puzzle game at Mulch Island. Completing all levels unlocked collectible Bin Bot creatures online. Players could pick up three exclusive collectible Bin Bots by completing all the levels in Beat the Clock Mode. They could also earn bonus Mulch and XP (experience points) every day on Tink's Blocks for their weevil. There was a high score leaderboard and several levels.

Meet The Bin Weevils 
Meet The Bin Weevils was released in December 2012. The mobile app featured over 80 characters and their zany family lines, character fact files, character galleries with artwork, and exclusive extended cartoon episodes.

Weevil World 
55 Pixels Ltd released a beta version of a new game called "Weevil World" in May 2017, which was only available for paying members at the time. The beta ended and the game was released to all players a month later. The game was a multiplayer unity app for mobile devices and computers, allowing players to cross-play between Weevil World and Bin Weevils using the same account. After signing up, players could customise their weevil profile and navigate their character around the island. Players could purchase character clothing, gift items, level up, earn Gems and Dosh to buy home (nest) decorations in the game and can invite players to get a nest rating.

Farm Craft  

55 Pixels Ltd released ''Farm Craft'' in July 2016. The world allows players to farm exotic plants, collect helpers, craft items, decorate houses and trade. Many core elements of the app were inspired by Bin Weevils.

Bin Weevils Connect 
On 23 August 2016, a new app named "Bin Weevils Connect" was revealed. Bin Weevils Connect was an app which complemented Bin Weevils many features such as the friend list, customizing the created character, playing multiplayer games with friends at quick access, and sending friend messages.

Reception 
In 2015, Bin Weevils was requested by the Advertising Standard Authority (ASA) to change the wording of their in-app advertising, stating that players were under pressure to purchase items in the game.  55 Pixels Ltd, the company which operates the game, said that "as soon as [we] were made aware of the complaint made to the Advertising Standards Authority about a potential breach, and once we had understood the area for concern, we changed all our membership pages to comply with their recommendations. [The ASA] subsequently upheld the complaint about the original wording but referenced that we now complied, in the text of the ruling."

In September 2014, Bin Weevils suffered a data breach culminating in unauthorised access to some accounts. Bin Weevils had been alerted of the vulnerability and had taken the website down for a week to carry out security maintenance. A captcha was added to the website during the breach, which users had to verify before they could proceed.

Awards 
Bin Weevils was nominated for the BAFTA Awards in 2009. Bin Weevils received the "Best Website" BAFTA Award in 2011. To celebrate, new nest items were launched in-game. Bin Weevils won the BAFTA Awards again towards the end of 2012.  Bin Weevils won the "Best Website" for the third time in late 2013, and again in 2014.

References

External links

Official Bin Weevils Website

Defunct British websites
Europe-exclusive video games
Online games
2007 video games
Massively multiplayer online games
Browser games
Children's websites
Flash games
2007 establishments in the United Kingdom
2021 disestablishments in the United Kingdom
Internet properties disestablished in 2021
Inactive massively multiplayer online games